Cozz & Effect is the debut studio album by American rapper Cozz. It was released on October 3, 2014, by Dreamville Records and Interscope Records.

Background
The album features guest appearances from Dreamville's artists and his label-mates, J. Cole, and Bas, as well as Enimal and Free Akrite. The production came from Meez, Divenchi, Mike Free, Trauma Tone.

Critical reception

The album received acclaim upon its release, with critics highly praising Cozz's rhyme schemes and lyrical themes along with the production. Justin Hunte from HipHopDX said "Cozz’s shifting rhyme schemes impress throughout Cozz & Effect. He’ll enter a track bombastically off-kilter, stumble into a separate topic four-bars-in, and then lyrically wreck shop the rest of the way," and "Cozz & Effect serves as passport to the conversation. It’s brash, passionate, and lyrically impressive enough to anticipate the future—an emphatic win for all involved." Mike Philson from HotNewHipHop said "Cozz has a lot of upside, and proves he is as fine a wordsmith as any other young rapper in the game on Cozz & Effect. We're looking forward to him exhibit a bit more range as an artist, as can only come with more life experiences. It's a solid project if you're a fan of raw lyrical ability. Cozz definitely represented J. Cole's label well, as Cozz is a rapper's rapper, a hip-hop purist, with the whole world at his fingertips."

Track listing

References

2014 debut albums
Interscope Records albums
Dreamville Records albums